James Keller, M.M. (June 27, 1900 – February 7, 1977) was a Catholic priest in the Maryknoll Order. In 1945 he founded of The Christophers, a Christian inspirational group which broadcast a weekly inspirational television show (of the same name) on ABC. ABC canceled the show in the mid-1960s;  Keller continued to produce it, however, and it is still syndicated to local television stations. The Christophers also award the Christopher Awards each year, primarily to media that exemplify the human spirit, and have a weekly syndicated radio show.

Early years
Keller's father was an Irish immigrant named James Kelleher, who changed his name to Keller to avoid anti-Irish sentiment.  His mother, Margaret Selby, was Irish on her mother's side and Portuguese on her father's. James Jr. was born in 1900 in Oakland, California, the fourth of six children in a devout Roman Catholic household.

After a brief stint in the US Army, Keller entered a seminary in Menlo Park, California.  After two years, he was inspired by contacts with  Father Thomas F. Price and Father James Anthony Walsh, leaders of the Catholic Foreign Mission Society of America, more familiarly known as Maryknoll.  In 1921, he left California, to attend the Maryknoll Seminary in Ossining, New York.

He spent the summer of 1922 doing orderly work and watching medical and surgical procedures at St. Vincent's Hospital in New York, in order to prepare himself for mission work in areas without medical care. In 1923, he was ordained subdeacon and made a commitment to lifetime celibacy. He then continued his education at Catholic University in Washington, D.C., where he received his baccalaureate and, the following year, a master's degree in medieval history.  From a professor, Peter Guilday, he learned the importance of historical trends as opposed to individual occurrences. In 1925 he was, atypically, ordained in his parish church in Oakland, CA., largely because his archbishop thought he would get a better crowd, which would be exposed to the Maryknoll movement.

He was surprised when he was told to remain in California for a vacation while awaiting assignment.  Then he learned that Fr. McCormack, who headed the small Maryknoll chapter in San Francisco, had been assigned to a mission in China, and that he was to take over as chapter head at the age of 25, fresh out of school.

Keller never received an overseas mission assignment.

Keller starred in a 1951 documentary called You Can Change the World that was based on his teachings. He went on to be the host of a 1950s and 1960s television show called Christopher Closeup.

References

External links
The Christophers' biography of Keller

Maryknoll Fathers
Television producers from California
Religious broadcasting in the United States
Catholic University of America alumni
People from Oakland, California
1900 births
1977 deaths
Maryknoll Seminary alumni
20th-century American businesspeople
Catholics from California
20th-century American Roman Catholic priests